Nakhchivan Economic Region is one of the 14 economic regions of Azerbaijan. It borders Iran to the south, Turkey to the west, and Armenia to the north and east. The region covers the Nakhchivan Autonomous Republic and consists of the districts of Babek, Julfa, Kangarli, Ordubad, Sadarak, Shahbuz, Sharur and the city of Nakhchivan. Its population was estimated to be at 461.5 thousand people in January 2021.

References 

Economic regions of Azerbaijan